WJAX-TV (channel 47) is a television station in Jacksonville, Florida, United States, affiliated with CBS. It is owned by Hoffman Communications, which maintains a joint sales agreement (JSA) with Cox Media Group, owner of Fox/Telemundo affiliate WFOX-TV (channel 30), for the provision of certain services. The stations share studios on Central Parkway, while WJAX-TV's transmitter is located on Hogan Road, both in Jacksonville's Southside section.

History
The station was the brainchild of John Stone Thigpenn who, while working as an announcer at Christian radio station WBIX (1010 AM, now WJXL) during May 1977, read Pat Robertson's "Shout it From the Housetops," Robertson's personal account of how he founded the Christian Broadcasting Network. Thigpenn, who gained faith to create a similar venture in Jacksonville, mentioned on the air that he wanted to start a Christian television station in the Jacksonville market. Within minutes of this announcement, listener Janice Paulk from Fernandina Beach called to ask who she should make a check out to in support of the effort. Thigpenn suggested the name "Christian Television of Jacksonville," knowing he could later formally create a business license and banking account under that name. Three days later, a check for $1,000 was received from Paulk.

Further inspired by such a generous donation, Thigpenn contacted his friend Russell Linenkohl, president of the local Full Gospel Businessmen's Association. Linenkohl suggested teaming up with other Christian business leaders to jointly discuss how best to proceed. Included in that group were physicians already known by Thigpenn, Stephen Gyland and Douglas Fowler. Other businessmen being recommended were local bankers Richard Martin, Rufus Kite Powell and Thomas McGehee. The group agreed to hold a public meeting to invite citizen comments regarding the endeavor. At the end of this public meeting, the attendees voted to appoint the head table to form a selection committee tasked with appointing and forming a Board of Directors for Christian Television of Jacksonville.

Before the public meeting, Thigpenn had already contacted the Broadcast Bureau of the Federal Communications Commission (FCC) to discover that two UHF channel allocations (channels 30 and 47) were available for use in Jacksonville. He also discovered that two entities were already competing for the channel 30 frequency. The group decided to avoid the time and expense of litigating a challenge for that allotment and opted to file for a license to operate a station on channel 47. Thigpenn, who did not share the same community prominence as the other appointing members, agreed to act as a silent partner to the newly appointed Board of Directors for Christian Television of Jacksonville. He subsequently headed up the Community Ascertainment requirement as one of several exhibits needed by the FCC as part of the license application process.

While Christian Television of Jacksonville received the construction permit and eventual license from the FCC, it did not garner the expected financial donations from the community to sustain its operating costs. The board then decided to transfer the ownership to Thomas McGehee, who was serving as the board's president. McGehee and his brother Frank McGehee formed North Florida Television Incorporated, which was awarded the license transfer by the FCC. Thigpenn was appointed to the new board and was listed as a principal on the newly granted license.

After all the planning and financing, the station officially signed on the air on August 1, 1980 as WXAO-TV (standing for the Greek letters for "Christ, the Alpha and Omega"). It first broadcast from studio facilities located on University Boulevard/SR 109 on Jacksonville's Southside. It was the first independent station in Jacksonville. Thigpenn served as the station's first news director during its first four years on the air. The station intended to be a family-friendly alternative to the network programs on the market's commercial television stations; it carried religious programs from the PTL Satellite Network, the Christian Television Network and the Trinity Broadcasting Network, as well as secular programs including cartoons, westerns and a few classic sitcoms. WXAO was the first television station in Jacksonville to broadcast on a 24-hour schedule. However, it never generated very high viewership. Gradually, the station abandoned most of its religious programming and transitioned to a general-entertainment independent format. On June 27, 1983, the station changed its call letters to WNFT. At that point, it began running more movies and drama series. By 1989, it was airing a blend of cartoons, recent off-network sitcoms and drama series, and movies. The McGehees sold WNFT to Krypton Broadcasting in 1990 for approximately $3 million; Krypton owned two other stations with similar formats, WTVX in West Palm Beach and WABM in Birmingham, Alabama.

Krypton filed for bankruptcy in 1993 and sold its stations to separate owners over the next year. In October 1994, WNFT was sold to RDS Broadcasting, which entered into a local marketing agreement with Clear Channel Communications (now iHeartMedia), owner of Fox affiliate WAWS (channel 30). WNFT integrated its operations into that station's studio facilities on Central Parkway; the two stations pooled resources and programming, while running the strongest syndicated programs (including cartoons and sitcoms) on WAWS. Meanwhile, WNFT restructured its schedule to focus largely on older cartoons, movies, sitcoms and drama series. It became a charter affiliate of the United Paramount Network (UPN) when the network launched on January 16, 1995. The station changed its call letters to WTEV-TV (which had previously been used by present-day ABC affiliate WLNE-TV in New Bedford, Massachusetts as a CBS affiliate) on March 4, 1996. During the late 1990s, WTEV began decreasing its reliance on classic sitcoms, cut back on cartoons, and began to focus more of its programming inventory on talk and reality shows. Clear Channel would buy the station outright in 2000, creating the second television duopoly in the Jacksonville market.

Joining CBS

On April 23, 2002, CBS signed an affiliation agreement with Clear Channel for WTEV-TV to become the new CBS affiliate for the Jacksonville television market. The network's longtime affiliate, WJXT (channel 4), chose not to renew its affiliation agreement with the network after CBS supplied the station's owner, Post-Newsweek Stations (now the Graham Media Group), with a list of demands that included the payment of reverse compensation to the network (instead of receiving payments, as was the case in the past) to continue carrying CBS programming and limiting preemptions of CBS programming to events where breaking news and severe weather coverage necessitate it. WTEV officially became a CBS affiliate on July 15, 2002, with WJXT opting to become an independent station. In addition, this triggered an affiliation switch in Gainesville where WGFL, once a WB affiliate, became a CBS affiliate. At the time, WAWS assumed the UPN affiliation on a secondary basis (airing it on a tape delay from 11:00 p.m. to 1:00 a.m.) and acquired several syndicated sitcoms that WTEV no longer had room on its schedule to air (coincidentally, both CBS and UPN were owned by the original Viacom at the time). WTEV also began carrying most Jacksonville Jaguars regular season games through CBS' broadcast rights to the NFL's American Football Conference division, along with many high-profile college football games through the network's contract with the Southeastern Conference, including the annual Florida–Georgia football rivalry game held at EverBank Field on the first Saturday of November.

With WTEV obtaining the CBS affiliation, the situation resulted in the first instance where two broadcasting companies controlled the Big Four network affiliates in one market (the Gannett Company owns both ABC affiliate WJXX (channel 25) and NBC affiliate WTLV (channel 12)), as well as making Jacksonville one of the only United States television markets with all six major broadcast networks (ABC, CBS, NBC, Fox, and at the time, UPN and The WB) having affiliations with only five stations in a six station-market (which remains the case in the present day with UPN and WB successors The CW and MyNetworkTV) and one of the few where an analog-era VHF station has no network affiliation while all the other stations in the market do.

On April 20, 2007, Clear Channel entered into an agreement to sell its television stations to Newport Television, a newly formed television station group controlled by private equity firm Providence Equity Partners. Since WTEV was also included in the deal, this would have violated FCC rules preventing common ownership of two of the four highest-rated stations in a single market as defined by total-day ratings. Clear Channel had bought WTEV when it was a low-rated UPN affiliate, but by this point had surpassed WJXT and WCWJ (channel 17) in total-day viewership. As a result, the FCC granted Newport Television a temporary waiver for the acquisition of WTEV and WAWS. With that, the company was able to complete its purchase of the station group on March 14, 2008. As a result, the FCC granted Newport Television a temporary waiver to acquire WAWS and WTEV, provided that Newport sell one of the two stations within six months of the sale's consummation. After the group deal closed on March 14, 2008, Newport had originally planned to sell off WAWS to another company while retaining ownership of WTEV.

However in May 2008, it agreed to sell the license assets of WTEV and five other Newport stations to High Plains Broadcasting due to ownership conflicts in the affected markets; the purchase was finalized on September 15 of that year. As the deal was a sale in name only, Newport continued to operate the stations (and thus, WTEV effectively remained a sister outlet to WAWS) after the sale closed on September 15. It effectively made High Plains Broadcasting a front company or "shell corporation" for Newport Television similar to the existing relationships between the Nexstar Broadcasting Group and Mission Broadcasting and the Sinclair Broadcast Group and Cunningham Broadcasting. This arrangement also placed WTEV in the unusual position of being the junior partner in a virtual duopoly with a Fox affiliate (the Big Three station normally serves as the senior partner in most virtual or legal duopolies involving a Fox affiliate and a Big Three-affiliated station).

On July 19, 2012, Newport Television announced the sale of WAWS and WTEV-TV to Cox Media Group, in a four-station deal that also involved the Tulsa, Oklahoma sister duopoly of KOKI-TV and KMYT-TV. The sale to Cox placed WAWS and WTEV under common ownership with the company's radio station cluster in Jacksonville (WOKV (690 AM and 106.5 FM, now WXXJ), WFYV-FM (104.5, now WOKV-FM), WJGL (96.9), WXXJ (102.9, now WEZI) and WAPE-FM (95.1)) as well as Cox's Orlando duopoly of ABC affiliate WFTV and independent station WRDQ. Due to the very same rules that forced the license of WTEV to be transferred to a separate licensee back in 2008, Cox acquired WAWS outright and transferred WTEV's license assets to Bayshore Television, LLC, which then turned over WTEV's operations to Cox under a joint sales agreement. The FCC approved the transaction on October 24, and it was finalized on December 3.

On August 26, 2014, Cox announced their intention to change WTEV's call letters to WJAX-TV, contingent on FCC approval, through a request made in July. In an email to The Florida Times-Union, general manager Jim Zerwekh stated that the change would better associate the station with Jacksonville. Concurrently with the change to WJAX-TV, sister station WAWS was renamed WFOX-TV. The change took effect on September 7, 2014. The WJAX call letters were also used in Jacksonville on 1220 AM; the two stations were not related, as WJAX radio was owned by Jones College.

On February 27, 2018, it was announced that Bayshore Television would sell WJAX-TV to Hoffman Communications for $1.2 million. Cox would continue to operate the station. The deal was approved by the FCC on April 17, 2018, and was completed on May 8.

In February 2019, it was announced that Apollo Global Management would acquire Cox Media Group and Northwest Broadcasting's stations (including the JSA with WJAX-TV). Although the group planned to operate under the name Terrier Media, it was later announced in June 2019 that Apollo would also acquire Cox's radio and advertising businesses, and retain the Cox Media Group name. The sale was completed on December 17, 2019.

Programming

Syndicated programming
Syndicated programs broadcast by WJAX-TV (as of September 2022) include Family Feud, Tamron Hall, Dr. Phil, and The Doctors among others.

Sports programming
Since its 2002 affiliation switch to CBS, then-WTEV-TV became the official broadcaster of most Jacksonville Jaguars regular-season games due to the network's contract involving AFC teams. The first Jaguars game to air on the station as the new CBS affiliate was the team's Week 1 home game versus the Indianapolis Colts on September 8, 2002.

WJAX simulcast Yahoo!'s broadcast of the Jaguars game in London against the Buffalo Bills in October 2015, per NFL rules requiring simulcasting on over-the-air stations in the markets of the participating teams. It was the first ever streaming-exclusive broadcast of an NFL game.

News operation

WJAX-TV presently broadcasts 30 hours of locally produced newscasts each week (with five hours each weekday, two hours on Saturdays and three hours on Sundays); in addition, the station produces the sports highlight programs Action Sports Jax Primetime, which airs weekend evenings at 11:30 p.m. (the station also produces a half-hour version of the program for WFOX-TV after its 10:00 p.m. newscast on weekends) and Friday Night Blitz, which airs Fridays at 11:15 p.m. The stations utilize Doppler radar data from the National Weather Service Forecast Office near Jacksonville International Airport.

In the late 1990s, WAWS began producing a half-hour early evening newscast for WTEV titled UPN 47 News at 6:30, which aired Monday through Fridays; the 6:30 broadcast was canceled in June 2002, a couple of weeks prior to the affiliation switch. Once WTEV became a CBS affiliate in July 2002, the station expanded its local news programming, adding a full slate newscasts at 5:30 a.m. (effectively "moving" over from WAWS), noon, 5:00, 5:30, 6:00 and 11:00 p.m. on Monday through Fridays, along with weekend evening newscasts. WAWS's existing news department essentially took over primary newscast production for the station. Initially, WTEV maintained certain primary personnel (such as news anchors) that would only appear on the newscasts on channel 47. In addition, newscasts used separate on-air branding and graphics packages, with WTEV's newscasts being conducted from the duopoly's newsroom in order to distinguish the two outlets and retain separate on-air identities.

In the late 2000s, WTEV's weekday morning newscast began to be simulcast on WAWS. Corresponding with the change, Action News This Morning was expanded to two hours (from 5:00 to 7:00), with a two-hour extension of the program (from 7:00 to 9:00 a.m.) eventually being added on WAWS. WAWS would later break away from the unified brand and introduce its own separate graphics and music package, and logo based on those originated in the mid-2000s on Fox's owned-and-operated stations on September 19, 2010. On April 13, 2009, WTEV and WAWS began utilizing a single on-air identity for their respective newscasts, branding their news programming collectively as Action News, presumably done as a way to compete with the First Coast News operation of rivals WTLV and WJXX. With the overhaul came the introduction of new sets (with WAWS maintaining a separate set for its nightly 10:00 p.m. newscast), on-air graphics, weather center and website.

On January 31, 2010, WTEV/WAWS became the second television news operation in the Jacksonville market to begin broadcasting their local newscasts in high definition (after WJXT, which upgraded on January 14, 2009; WTLV/WJXX upgraded their newscasts to HD the day after WAWS/WTEV's conversion to high definition newscasts). In 2010, WAWS/WTEV began airing a half-hour extension of its weekday morning newscast for channel 30 at 4:30 a.m. (WTEV continues to start its morning newscast at 5:00 a.m. as it carries the CBS Morning News in the 4:30 slot on a half-hour tape delay). On May 28, 2014, Cox Media Group management fired five WAWS/WTEV anchors—weeknight anchors Mark Spain, Tera Barz and Paige Kelton (the latter of whom had been with the news department since its 1997 establishment on WAWS), and morning anchors Lynnsey Gardner and Mike Barz—in a restructuring of its news staff; all five anchors are expected to leave the stations on or around September 1. The layoffs drew criticism from Jacksonville city council president Bill Guilford stating that Cox Media Group "exercised bad judgment" in cutting the five anchors.

Notable current on-air staff
 Phil Amato – anchor
 Mike Buresh (AMS Certified Broadcast Meteorologist Seal of Approval) – chief meteorologist

Notable former on-air staff
 Mike Barz – anchor
 Mark Spain – anchor

Technical information

Subchannels
The station's digital signal is multiplexed:

On April 1, 2014, Cox Media Group signed an affiliation agreement to carry the digital multicast movie network GetTV on WTEV-TV; the station began carrying the network in the summer of 2014 on subchannel 47.2, replacing Live Well Network. Sometime in 2020, GetTV on 47.2 was replaced by Cozi TV, which has been airing on WRCZ-LD 35.3.

Analog-to-digital conversion
On June 12, 2009, WJAX-TV (as WTEV-TV) terminated its analog signal, on UHF channel 47, as part of the federally mandated transition from analog to digital television. The station's digital signal remained on its pre-transition UHF channel 19. Through the use of PSIP, digital television receivers display WJAX-TV's virtual channel as 47.

References

External links

Television channels and stations established in 1980
1980 establishments in Florida
JAX-TV
Cox Media Group
CBS network affiliates
Cozi TV affiliates
Decades (TV network) affiliates